Traumatic asphyxia, or Perthes's syndrome, is a medical emergency caused by an intense compression of the thoracic cavity, causing venous back-flow from the right side of the heart into the veins of the neck and the brain.

Signs and symptoms
Traumatic asphyxia is characterized by cyanosis in the upper extremities, neck, and head as well as petechiae in the conjunctiva.  Patients can also display jugular venous distention and facial edema. Associated injuries include pulmonary contusion, myocardial contusion, hemo/pneumothorax, and broken ribs.

Causes
Traumatic asphyxia occurs when a powerful compressive force is applied to the thoracic cavity. This is most often seen in motor vehicle accidents, as well as industrial and farming accidents. However, it can be present anytime a significant pressure is applied to the thorax.

Pathophysiology
The sudden impact on the thorax causes an increase in intrathoracic pressure.  In order for traumatic asphyxia to occur, a Valsalva maneuver is required when the traumatic force is applied. Exhalation against the closed glottis along with the traumatic event causes air that cannot escape from the thoracic cavity. Instead, the air causes increased venous back-pressure, which is transferred back to the heart through the right atrium, to the superior vena cava and to the head and neck veins and capillaries.

Diagnosis
Patients are seen with a cyanotic discoloration of the shoulder skin and neck and face, jugular distention, bulging of the eyeballs, and swelling of the tongue and lips. The latter two are resultants of edema, caused by excessive blood accumulating the veins of the head and neck and venous stasis.

Prognosis
For individuals who survive the initial crush injury, survival rates are high for traumatic asphyxia.

See also
Asphyxia
Crush syndrome
Flail chest
Tension pneumothorax
Traumatic aortic rupture

References

External links 

Chest trauma
Skin conditions resulting from physical factors
Medical emergencies
Traumatology